Demyankovo is a rural locality (a village) in Sidorovskoye Rural Settlement, Gryazovetsky District, Vologda Oblast, Russia. The population was 10 as of 2002.

Geography 
Demyankovo is located 44 km east of Gryazovets (the district's administrative centre) by road. Klobukino is the nearest rural locality.

References 

Rural localities in Gryazovetsky District